Tumisa (also known as ) is a Pleistocene stratovolcano in the Andes. Located east of the Salar de Atacama, it is part of the Central Volcanic Zone, which since the Miocene has been subject to extensive andesitic/dacitic effusive activity and ignimbrite eruptions. The basement on which Tumisa is built includes Paleozoic rocks and more recent volcanic products of the Lejia volcano and the Atana and Patao ignimbrites.

Block flows, lava flows, lava domes and some ignimbrites of pumiceous composition form this composite volcano. The pyroclastic flows contain pumice and large blocks, some of which show signs of deformation when they were still hot. The lava domes and lavas are grouped in three units. Presumably, the activity of Tumisa started with explosive eruptions that generated the ignimbrite apron, later degassed magma formed the lava domes and lava flows.

Tumisa developed atop lake sediments which facilitate sliding. This interpretation is supported by the drainage patterns of the volcano, with channels bending outwards and curving towards the west. These channels possibly formed over faults of the slipping volcano. Valleys were excavated less than one million years ago during the glacial stages in Tumisa's northern flank. Moraines are also found and reflect the past occurrence of glaciation on the mountain; they lie at around  elevation.

The volcano has erupted dacitic lavas containing andesitic mafic inclusions. These inclusions resemble those from the Soncor flow of neighbouring Lascar to the northeast. Some rocks may have been influenced by the interaction with calcium carbonate in the magma chambers. The textures of the products suggest that magma mixing occurred during activity. The dacites have a white porphyritic appearance. The dome complex is dated 2.5-0.5 mya and the associated pyroclastics 1.5-0.5 mya and constructed on Tertiary ignimbrites. One date of 1.2±0.6 million years was obtained from the Las Mulas dome. The complex is of Pleistocene age. Later, hydrothermal alteration occurred.

A fault with probably postglacial activity crosses Lejía Lake and is associated with Tumisa, connecting Tumisa with a basaltic maar and an isolated lava dome. It runs in northwest-southeast direction and crosses Lejia on its southern margin.

An abandoned sulfur mine lies on its eastern slope and a road leads to it.

References

External links 
 

Stratovolcanoes of Chile
Pleistocene stratovolcanoes